was a village located on Amami Ōshima in Ōshima District, Kagoshima Prefecture, Japan.

As of 2003, the village had an estimated population of 1,943 and the density of 16.44 persons per km². The total area was 118.16 km².

On March 20, 2006, Sumiyō, along with the city of Naze, and the town of Kasari (also from Ōshima District), was merged to create the city of Amami.

Points of interest
 Amami Islands Botanical Garden

External links
 Official website or Amami 

Dissolved municipalities of Kagoshima Prefecture